The 1921 season of Auckland Rugby League was its 13th. Seventy two teams played across its six main grades.

    
    
    
    
The first grade competition featured seven teams, City Rovers, Marist Old Boys, Maritime, Devonport, Fire Brigade (formerly Grafton Athletic), Newton Rangers, and Ponsonby United. City Rovers comfortably won the senior championship for the 4th time with a 8 win, 1 draw, 0 loss record ahead of Maritime who were unable to repeat their title win from the previous season. City had previously won the title in 1910, 1911, and 1916. This was to be the first of 3 consecutive titles for them. They also won the Roope Rooster knockout competition for the 3rd time after previous wins in 1916 and 1918.

News

Junior Management Committee
The Junior management committee elected for the season was: G. Stevens, W. Church, J. Ball, H. Clayton, W. Dowle, A.E. Smith, W. Lusty, W.J. Davidson (Hon. Sec), T. Fielding (Chairman), J. Aggers, K. Lippiatt.

Club name changes and mergers 
On 13 April the Management Committee of the Auckland Rugby League met. At the meeting Grafton was granted permission to change its name to "Fire Brigade Club". Devonport United notified the league that the Devonport Borough Council had allocated the Devonport Domain for its use. During the season the club was named 'North Shore' and 'Devonport' interchangeably by both The New Zealand Herald and the Auckland Star. In 1920 the club had seen a merger between North Shore Albions and the Sunnyside club and agreed on the name Devonport United but it appears that the stronger club's name was still more favoured by those reporting on the games, and it was eventually the name adopted by the club. While the Kingsland Rovers club wrote asking for advice on what it should do regarding a ground for the club to play at.

Carlaw Park open for business 
 Carlaw Park was named after James Carlaw who had been heavily involved in the development of rugby league in the Auckland area for many years. History was made on 25 June when the first ever match was played on Carlaw Park between City Rovers and Maritime. The match was won by City Rovers 10 points to 8. Prior to the match an official opening ceremony was held. "The park was declared open by Hon. Arthur Myers, MP. Mr and Mrs. Carlaw were each presented with a gold badge and certificate of life membership on the ground, and at the conclusion of the ceremony Mrs Carlaw kicked off for the first game on the new park". City Rovers capped a remarkable season by winning the Thacker Shield from Ponsonby United on the final day of the season after having already won the Monteith Shield by winning the First Grade Championship, and the Roope Rooster Knock-out trophy.

Female football club denied by the league 
On 12 July a meeting was held in Parnell to form a "girls" rugby league competition with over 40 enrolling. They were to play a game on Carlaw Park on the following Saturday afternoon. They were all aged between 16 and 20 years of age. The chairman of the Parnell club, Mr. A.R. Turner explained "that it wished to develop the girls as well as the men, and to this end the club was being formed at the suggestion of the girls". A trophy "similar to the Monteith Shield" had been donated, and "members of the Auckland League Management Committee had donated a football, and were providing assistance in supplying jerseys. At the meeting when the time for enrollment came it was described that "they rose in a body and fairly rushed the table, which was in danger of being overturned in the excitement of the moment" Ivan Culpan, secretary of the league told the girls that the league would train them every evening in the lead up to the match. Over the next week the number of girls enrolled increased to 65. It later transpired that the members of the Auckland Rugby League who had attended had done so by invitation and were not necessarily acting on behalf of the league with the comments they had made. At the Auckland Rugby league Management meeting the following night the decision on whether to support the girls playing and affiliate the club with the league was deferred. Both George Hunt and E Phelan spoke against allowing the girls to play. And at a meeting on 20 July the Auckland Rugby League decided to oppose the girls playing football. Mr. James Carlaw said that medical opinion was in opposition to females playing the sport. Mr Stallworthy and Mr. E. Feilding suggested a trial game with modified rules take place with doctors watching but the request was declined.

Arthur Singe switches to rugby league 
At the beginning of the season Marist Old Boys enticed Arthur Singe to join the club. He was an outstanding rugby player playing in the wing-forward position (flanker in today's terms). He played for the New Zealand Army rugby team which toured Great Britain and then South Africa at the end of the war. When he returned to New Zealand he played for the Marist rugby club and played for Auckland 8 teams. He narrowly missed the New Zealand rugby team to tour Australia after playing just 10 minutes in the North Island v South Island match which acted as a trial of sorts. He switched codes and joined Marist, playing for them in 1921–22 and 1925–26 before going on tour with the New Zealand team on their ill-fated tour of England. Seven players went on strike due to issues with management on the tour and were ultimately banned for life. Singe was the only Auckland player among the strikers. The ban was lifted in 1962, 26 years after his death in 1936. Singe was to play 48 games for Marist scoring 148 points, 15 games for Auckland scoring 25 points, and 8 matches for New Zealand.

Monteith Shield (first grade championship)

Monteith Shield standings 
{|
|-
|

Monteith Shield fixtures

Round 1

Round 2

Round 3

Round 4

Round 5

Round 6
Round 6 was somewhat farcical. Devonport fielded several juniors and when the score got to 14–0 in favour of Maritime very quickly four Maritime players changed teams to make it a more even contest. The remainder of the game more resembled a practice match. While Newton defaulted their match with Fire Brigade as only 6 players turned out. The New Zealand Herald match report stated that "counter-attractions proving too strong for the Newton players".

Round 7

Round 8

Round 9

Round 9 saw the opening of Carlaw Park and the first ever match played on its soil. City defeated Maritime by 10 points to 8 in front of 7000 spectators. The other two matches for this round were postponed. The captains of both Newton and Devonport decided to postpone the match, though the majority of the Devonport players were unaware of this arrangement and arrived at the ground ready to play. While on the same day the Fire Brigade players were called to a warehouse fire in the city at mid-day and were tired and late arriving to the ground so the match was abandoned.

Round 10

Round 11
The City v Newton game was discontinued at halftime due to the score line. Newton had started the match a man short and the score line had already blown out to 37–5 by the interval.

Roope Rooster knockout competition
The first round match between Marist Old Boys and Maritime ended controversially with Marist complaining that the match had finished early (when they were trailing by 10 points to 8). They protested and the match was replayed with Maritime winning 21 to 10. The referee in charge, W. Ripley announced his resignation in the following week but did referee again for several years and later served on the board of the Referee's Association.

The final was won by City Rovers who defeated Maritime in the final in front of a large crowd by 30 points to 14. Over £230 were taken at the gate which was a record for Carlaw Park, albeit in its first season of use. From this 50 percent went to the Auckland League Sick and Injured Players' Fund, 25 percent to the Hospital Radium Fund, and 25 percent to the St. John Ambulance Association.

Round 1

Semi final

Round 1 replay

Semi final

Final

Top try scorers and point scorers
Bill Davidson's point total includes senior matches in the championship and the Roope Rooster.

Other club matches and lower grades

Challenge Shield 
The Thacker Shield was held by Ponsonby United coming into the 1921 season however there was a dispute over whether the shield should be held by North Island teams as it was unclear if it had been intended for competition among South Island teams only. The New Zealand council decided that the rules should be amended to allow North Island teams to hold it but the donor, Dr. H. T.J. Thacker and the Canterbury Rugby League would not agree to them. As such the shield was returned to the donor. Mr. C Weaver donated a trophy to take its place and this became known as the Challenge Shield and it was this that Ponsonby went on to defend twice. They first hosted Petone from Wellington who they beat 18–13. In the curtain-raiser Petone juniors were defeated by Richmond by 14 points to 8. In the evening the Petone players were entertained at the Druids' Hall by the Ponsonby club and Auckland League. They later defeated Huntly 19–8 before losing the Shield to local rivals City Rovers

Exhibition matches

Lower grades 
There were 7 lower grades in 1921 if you include the Sixth Grade which was split into an A and B grade, and the cadet competition.

Second grade
Newton defeated Maritime in the second grade final by 17 points to 11 at Carlaw Park to win the Second Grade Cup. Future New Zealand representative Charles Gregory played for Newton. They ultimately finished the season with a 10 win, 1 draw, 1 loss record, scoring 149 points and conceding 57. North Shore withdrew prior to round 2, Marist withdrew after round 8, Manukau after round 10, and City after round 11. There were very few results reported and Newton's win/loss and for and against record was learned from their championship team photograph.
{|
|-
|

Third grade (Myers Cup)
Kingsland Rovers won the competition when they drew with Newton 9-9 on August 6 in round 12. Future New Zealand international Claude List was in the Kingsland side, aged 18. In the first 5 rounds many results were reported however the second half of the season had very few reported. Parnell entered a team in the knockout competition which began on August 13 and had a 3-3 draw with Ellerslie. Marist were scheduled to play Ellerslie in round 1 but there was no result reported and they withdrew from the competition after this.
{|
|-
|

Fourth grade
Otahuhu won the competition following their round 15 win over Ponsonby by 17 points to 3. Maritime defaulted their round 3 match with Otahuhu and withdrew the following week. There were many results not reported throughout the season.
{|
|-
|

Fifth grade
City Rovers defeated Richmond by 5 points to 2 to win the championship. There were very few results reported during the season. Marist entered 2 teams however their B team withdrew after round 3. Kingsland withdrew after round 11, and North Shore and Manukau after round 12. Parnell entered a team late in the season to play a friendly match.
{|
|-
|

Sixth grade A
Richmond won the competition. There were very few results reported during the season. Parnell entered a team in the competition on July 23 though it is unclear if their 5 matches counted towards the championship. Only one of their results was reported, a 9-2 loss to Maritime.
{|
|-
|

Sixth grade B
Ponsonby won the competition. There were almost no results reported beyond round 6, with only 3 of Ponsonby's results reported. Parnell entered a team on July 16 and played 3 matches. It is unclear if their matches contributed to the final standings, the only game that had a result reported for them was a 33-0 loss to Ponsonby.
{|
|-
|

Cadet competition
This was the first year that a cadet competition had been played. The 18th Company won the competition. The 34th Cadets were based in Mt Eden while the 51st Senior Cadets were based in Devonport. This competition was won by the 18th Company of Senior Cadets after they won the final game of the season defeating the 13th Company by 7 points to 2. The 23rd Company played a match with the 37th Company which they won 19 to 0. This match was outside of the competition.

Auckland Rugby League seasons
Auckland Rugby League